Elizabeth Hely Walshe (1835-1869), was an Irish born writer of both children's stories and histories.

Life
Elizabeth Hely Walshe was born in 1835 in Limerick to an evangelical Protestant family. Her father was a clergyman and she had at least one sister. She lived in Canada for some years but was back in Ireland by 1865. She was  an accomplished artist and musician. She worked as a Sunday-school teacher. She also believed in the  education of the poor. Walshe was a regular contributor to Leisure Hour Magazine and Sunday at Home. She also worked with George Etell Sargent on stories for children. Like many writers of that era the Irish Famine has an impact on the themes of her stories.

Walshe was on the Isle of Wight in 1869 when she died of consumption.

Bibliography

 Cedar Creek (1863)
 Story of the faith in Hungary 
 From dawn to dark in Italy (1865)
 Golden Hills (1865)
 The Manuscript Man (1869)
 The Foster-Brothers of Doon: A Tale of the Irish Rebellion of 1798 (1890)
 Within sea walls, or, How the Dutch kept the faith
 Kingston's revenge: a story of bravery and single-hearted endeavour

References and sources

1835 births
1869 deaths
19th-century Irish women writers
19th-century Canadian women writers
Writers from Limerick (city)
Irish children's writers
Irish women children's writers
Canadian women children's writers
Canadian children's writers
19th-century Irish writers
19th-century Canadian writers
19th-century deaths from tuberculosis
Tuberculosis deaths in England